John A. Rowan (June 3, 1896 – April 13, 1967) was an American football player.  A native of Ohio, he played college football for the University of Tennessee and professional football as a back for the Louisville Brecks in the National Football League (NFL). He appeared in three NFL games during the 1923 season.

References

1896 births
1967 deaths
Louisville Brecks players
Players of American football from Ohio
Tennessee Volunteers football players